The Perlis River is a river in Perlis, Malaysia.

Geography
The river spans over 11.8 km in length, making it the fourth-longest river in Perlis.

History
Under the 11th Malaysia Plan, 11 km of the river will be developed and beautified, on the section from Kuala Perlis to Kangar.

See also
 Geography of Malaysia

References

Rivers of Perlis
Rivers of Malaysia